An alpha privative or, rarely, privative a (from Latin , from Ancient Greek ) is the prefix a- or an- (before vowels) that is used in Indo-European languages such as Sanskrit and Greek and in words borrowed therefrom to express negation or absence, for example the English words of greek origin atypical, anesthetic, and analgesic.

It is derived from a Proto-Indo-European syllabic nasal *, the zero ablaut grade of the negation *, i.e. /n/ used as a vowel. For this reason, it usually appears as  before vowels (e.g. an-alphabetism, an-esthesia, an-archy).

It is not to be confused with, among other things, an alpha copulative (e.g. ) or the prepositional component  (i.e. the preposition  with ecthlipsis or elision of its final vowel before a following vowel; e.g. ).

Cognates

Sanskrit
The same prefix appears in Sanskrit, also as अ-  before consonants; and अन्-  before vowels.

Latin
The prepositional prefix  is unrelated.

Germanic languages
In English and other West Germanic languages, the cognate is un- (or on-).

In North Germanic languages, the -n- has disappeared and Old Norse has  (e.g. ), Danish and Norwegian have , whereas Swedish uses  (pronounced [u]), and Icelandic and Faroese use the related .

Homonym
The prefix   (also -  from psilosis), copulative a, is nearly homonymous with privative , but originates from Proto-Indo-European *.

See also

 Copulative a

References

Indo-European linguistics
Greek language